Brandhoek Military Cemetery is a Commonwealth War Graves Commission burial ground for the dead of the First World War located in Vlamertinge in Belgium on the Western Front.

The cemetery grounds were assigned to the United Kingdom in perpetuity by King Albert I of Belgium in recognition of the sacrifices made by the British Empire in the defence and liberation of Belgium during the war.

Foundation
The cemetery was begun by the British in May 1915 in a field next to a dressing station. The cemetery was closed in July 1917 when Brandhoek New Military Cemetery was opened.

The cemetery was designed by Sir Reginald Blomfield.

References

External links
 
 

Commonwealth War Graves Commission cemeteries in Belgium
Cemeteries and memorials in West Flanders
Reginald Blomfield buildings
World War I cemeteries in Belgium
Ypres Salient